Nijenhuis may refer to:
 Nijenhuis (Diepenheim) - a castle near Diepenheim, the Netherlands
 Nijenhuis (Olst-Wijhe) - a castle near Olst-Wijhe, the Netherlands
 Nijenhuis (surname) - a Dutch toponymic surname